Hill–Kurtz House is a historic residence in Griffin, Georgia in Spalding County. It was added to the National Register of Historic Places on March 20, 1973. It is located at 570 South Hill Street. Built in 1860 for Benjamin J. Milner, who helped muster a cavalry unit from Spalding County during the American Civil War. H.P. Hill, a printer, bought the home in 1866.

See also
National Register of Historic Places listings in Spalding County, Georgia

References

Houses on the National Register of Historic Places in Georgia (U.S. state)
Houses in Spalding County, Georgia
National Register of Historic Places in Spalding County, Georgia
Houses completed in 1860
Greek Revival houses in Georgia (U.S. state)